George Palmer (9 June 1879 – 30 June 1956) was an  Australian rules footballer who played with Geelong in the Victorian Football League (VFL).

Notes

External links 

1879 births
1956 deaths
Australian rules footballers from Victoria (Australia)
Geelong Football Club players